Ian Corbett Fleming (16 November 1909 – 1 November 1984) was an Australian rules footballer who played with Fitzroy in the Victorian Football League (VFL).

He was the younger brother of Frank Fleming and twin brother of Keith Fleming.

Notes

External links 
		

1909 births
1984 deaths
Australian rules footballers from Victoria (Australia)
Fitzroy Football Club players
Heidelberg Football Club players